Jaitaran is a city and a municipality in Pali district in the Indian state of Rajasthan.

History
Jaitaran was one of the districts under  Jodhpur State.  Rao Suja granted Jaitaran to his son, Rao Uda. Uda's descendants are known as Udawats and till 1947, Udawats held major thikanas around Jaitaran, like Raipur, Nimaj, Ras, Lambia. 
During Maratha raids in Marwar, Holkar found it very difficult to extort money from people around Jaitaran, Sojat and Raipur as they preferred to quit their huts, set fire to them rather than being forced to make any kind of payment.

Geography
It has an average elevation of 307 metres (1007 feet).

Demographics
 India census, Jaitaran had a population of 22,639. Males constitute 51% (11,564) of the population and females 49% (11,074). Jaitaran has an average literacy rate of 65.15%, lower than the national average of 74.04%: male literacy is 75.2%, and female literacy is 54.7%. In Jaitaran, 14% of the population is under 6 years of age.

Notable people
 

Dariyavji (1676–1758), Rajasthani poet

References

Cities and towns in Pali district